Maipayat (also spelled Maipayattu) is associated with the emergence of knowledge concerning meditative and prescriptive exercises. Originally recorded late in the Vedic period, in conjunction with Vedanta, is done working from a full-deep yogic breathing, by initiating set movement patterns that nurture creativity and feeds the body with breath energy. This energy is taught in Maipayat to be of the divine energy. The teachings of Maipayat are within many different branches of Tantra and Martial Arts. Similar exercises are taught in t'ai chi although Maipayat exercises more fluid movements while attempting to align the chakras.

Practitioners of Maipayat seek to ritually channel their harvested energy through practical training and development of breath and progressively more intensive rapid movements.

Proponent practitioners report that the method improves body-mind balance and coordination, causes a rejuvenation of spirit, and assists in creative potential. Maipayat, the oldest health art of breathing known from Ancient India. It is instructed as a self-healing yoga therapy in Ayurveda, and it also appears in conjunction with Indian martial arts:

"The foundation of Kalaripayattu, like all other martial arts, is structured movements called Maipayat, which are based on certain foundational stances drawn from the stances of animals like the elephant, horse, crocodile, boar, fish, peacock, snake and lion. Maipayat practice is associated with a lot of jumping and kicking movements that are typical to the practice of the Kalaripayattu." 

Subsequent offshoots of Maipayat have been the basis of various transplantations of sutras, such as in the late Han dynasty  dealing with breath control and mystical concentration. Bodhidharma is said to have transported to China in the fifth century, Buddhism combined with mind, body and breath training in the form of Maipayat. In China it customarily utilized Taoist vocabulary to make the Indian techniques intelligible to the Chinese. It shares many basic principles with Qigong and kungfu.

In modern times, it is proving popular among yoga instructors, dancers, singers and athletes as a tool to improve their energy levels.

References

Mind–body interventions
Martial art techniques
Pranayama